Riya Deepsi is an Indian film and television actress and model. She debuted in 2013 with the television series Mahabharat. In 2018, she made her Hindi film debut with Bhaagte Raho.

Career
She was a theatre artist before she entering in the small screen.

In 2013, Deepsi then 17 years old, made her TV debut with  Mahabharat , where she portrayed blindfolded  queen Gandhari. before Mahabharat she appeared on Mata Ki Chowki for an uncredited brief role.

After Mahabharat she appeared in Bharat Ka Veer Putra – Maharana Pratap, Razia Sultan and Begusarai for supporting roles. She has also participated in celebrity sports reality television show Box Cricket League.

From 2017 to 2018 she played as a parallel lead role of Princess Barsine, second wife of Alexander the Great in Porus.

In 2018, Deepsi made her Bollywood debut through Praful D.S. Tiwari's film, Bhaagte Raho, where she played the lead role of Gungun.

In 2019, she appeared in an episodic role of a YouTube web series Be Safe as Nidhi. In 2020, she appeared in a supporting role of Roma in ALTBalaji original web series It Happened in Calcutta.

Filmography

Films

Television

Web series

References

External links
 
 

Living people
Indian television actresses
Indian soap opera actresses
Year of birth missing (living people)